Greece competed at the 1960 Summer Olympics in Rome, Italy. 48 competitors, all men, took part in 38 events in 8 sports. Greek athletes have competed in every Summer Olympic Games.

Medalists

Athletics

Boxing

Rowing

Greece had six male rowers participate in two out of seven rowing events in 1960.

 Men's coxed pair
 Ioannis Khrysokhoou
 Ioannis Simbonis
 Ioannis Theodorakeas (cox)

 Men's coxed four
 Panagiotis Kalombratsos
 Ilias Polyzois
 Ioannis Simbonis
 Triantafyllos Tsongas
 Ioannis Theodorakeas (cox)

Sailing

Shooting

Seven shooters represented Greece in 1960.

25 m pistol
 Alkiviadis Papageorgopoulos
 Georgios Marmaridis

50 m pistol
 Dimitrios Kasoumis
 Georgios Marmaridis

50 m rifle, three positions
 Georgios Liveris
 Nikolaos Triantafyllopoulos

50 m rifle, prone
 Nikolaos Triantafyllopoulos
 Georgios Liveris

Trap
 Platon Georgitsis
 Georgios Pangalos

Swimming

Weightlifting

Wrestling

References

External links
Official Olympic Reports
International Olympic Committee results database

Nations at the 1960 Summer Olympics
1960
Summer Olympics
Constantine II of Greece